"Slippery" is a song by American hip hop group Migos featuring fellow American rapper Gucci Mane. It was sent to radio on May 16, 2017 as the third single from Migos' second studio album Culture (2017). The song was produced by frequent collaborators Deko and OG Parker.

Commercial performance
The song peaked at number 29 on the Billboard Hot 100 on the week of July 22, 2017.

Music video
The music video for the song, directed by Daps and Quavo, premiered May 4, 2017, via Migos' YouTube channel. The music video had 475 million views as of June 2022.

Charts

Weekly charts

Year-end charts

Certifications

References

External links

2017 songs
Migos songs
300 Entertainment singles
Gucci Mane songs
Songs written by Gucci Mane
2017 singles
Songs written by Quavo
Songs written by Offset (rapper)
Songs written by Takeoff (rapper)
Songs written by OG Parker
Song recordings produced by OG Parker